Sun's End is a novel by Richard A. Lupoff published in 1984.

Plot summary
Sun's End is a novel in which the main character awakes in 2089 rebuilt as a bionic superhuman with telepathic powers, and the richest man in the solar system.

Reception
Dave Langford reviewed Sun's End for White Dwarf #89, and stated that "Lupoff poses a problem: how to save 26 billion people from dying as the Sun overheats? He and his hero simply turn their backs on the question. Thumbs-down to both of them."

Reviews
Review by Michael R. Collings (1984) in Fantasy Review, December 1984
Review by Tom Easton (1985) in Analog Science Fiction/Science Fact, May 1985
Review by Robert Coulson (1985) in Amazing Stories, May 1985

References

1984 American novels
1984 science fiction novels